Diego Sebastián Cagna (born 19 April 1970) is an Argentine football coach and former player who played as midfielder.

Club career
Cagna was born in Buenos Aires. His first professional first division match was in December 1988, with Argentinos Juniors. He transferred to Independiente at the beginning of 1992, where he played for four years.

Cagna then went on to join Boca Juniors from the Apertura 1996 until the end of 1999 when, at 29 years of age and after finished the Apertura 1999, he moved to La Liga side Villarreal CF. He played two seasons with the Yellow Submarine, and after playing the Apertura 2002 with Primera División de México club Atlético Celaya, he returned to Boca Juniors in 2003.

Diego Cagna, who was team captain with Independiente, Boca Juniors and Villarreal, eventually becoming a reserve player behind Boca Juniors' promising youngsters, and retired in 2005. All in all, he played a total of 255 games for Boca, scoring 21 goals.

International career
With the Argentina national team Cagna won the Confederations Cup 1992, and participated in the Copa América 1999. His only goal for the national team was on 15 April 1998 friendly match against Israel in Jerusalem, which Argentina lost 2–1.

Managerial career
In December 2006, he became Tigre's manager, taking the club to the first division in only one season. Tigre's first year in the major division was successful with Tigre finishing in 2nd place in the Apertura 2007 championship. This was Tigre's highest ever finish in the top division, gaining Cagna notoriety from fans and the sports press.

In the Apertura 2008 championship Tigre finished joint top of the Primera División with Boca Juniors and San Lorenzo. Tigre had the best head-to-head record, San Lorenzo the best goal difference but Boca Juniors won the 3 way championship playoff on goal difference after the three teams once again finished level on points.

Cagna then guided Tigre to qualification to an international club competition for the first time in their history at the end of the 2008–09 season. Tigre appeared in the 2009 Copa Sudamericana, where they were eliminated in the first round by San Lorenzo.

Having taken Tigre into the last game of two championship seasons with the possibility of winning the championship and led them to international qualification for the first time in their history, his fortunes turned in the Apertura 2009 where Tigre finished bottom of the table with only 8 points from 19 games prompting his resignation on 14 December 2009 after over 3 years with the club. The former Chacarita coach replaces on 20 April 2010 Hugo Tocalli as Head Coach by Colo-Colo.

Unfortunately, Cagna's results with the twenty-nine time Chilean champions have been disappointing, losing a 7-point advantage through several games until the end of the 2010 season, finishing runners-up of that tournament (Universidad Católica became finally champions). Moreover, his international appearance in Copa Sudamericana meant another disappointment since "Los Albos" were kicked out in first round home/away leg versus Universitario de Sucre.

Even though fans' patience is running really thin from 2010 – and even more after a non-convincing start of 2011 season – Cagna is still having a place as Colo Colo's manager. Fans currently call him "Despreocupado" (unworried, carefree) because of his negligent attitude before, during and after every match. This nickname is closely linked to a very popular TV commercial from an international financial group in Chile.

Career statistics

Honours
Independiente
Argentine Primera División: Clausura 1994
Recopa Sudamericana: 1995

Boca Juniors
Argentine Primera División: Apertura 1998, Clausura 1999, Apertura 2003, Apertura 2005
Copa Libertadores: 2003
Copa Sudamericana: 2004, 2005
Recopa Sudamericana: 2005
Intercontinental Cup: 2003

Argentina
FIFA Confederations Cup: 1992

References

External links
 
 
 
 Managerial career in the Argentine Primera at Fútbol XXI  
 Argentine Primera statistics (incomplete) at Fútbol XXI  

1970 births
Living people
Footballers from Buenos Aires
Argentine people of Italian descent
Argentine footballers
Argentinos Juniors footballers
Club Atlético Independiente footballers
Boca Juniors footballers
La Liga players
Villarreal CF players
Atlético Celaya footballers
Argentina international footballers
1992 King Fahd Cup players
1999 Copa América players
Copa Libertadores-winning players
FIFA Confederations Cup-winning players
Argentine football managers
Club Atlético Tigre managers
Colo-Colo managers
Estudiantes de La Plata managers
C.D. Jorge Wilstermann managers
Argentine Primera División players
Argentine expatriate footballers
Expatriate football managers in Chile
Argentine expatriate sportspeople in Spain
Expatriate footballers in Spain
Pan American Games gold medalists for Argentina
Association football midfielders
Pan American Games medalists in football
Footballers at the 1995 Pan American Games
Medalists at the 1995 Pan American Games